William Lester Eagleton Jr. (August 17, 1926 – January 27, 2011) was a United States Foreign Service Officer and diplomat who served as Ambassador to several Middle Eastern and North African states.

Early life
Born in Peoria, Illinois, Eagleton served in the United States Navy from 1944 to 1946, and graduated from Yale University in 1948. He joined the U.S. foreign service in 1949.

Diplomatic career
Eagleton served as American consul in Tabriz, Iran between 1959 and 1961 and United States Ambassador to Yemen 1967, Tunisia 1977, Libya 1978–1979, Algeria 1979, Iraq 1980–1984 and Syria 1985–1988. He is also an author of The Kurdish Republic of 1946 (1961) and, "Iraqi Kurdistan" in The World Today (1956).

After his term as Ambassador to Syria ended in 1988, Eagleton worked with the United Nations as Deputy Commissioner-General for Palestinian Refugees (1988–94), Special Coordinator for Sarajevo (1994–1996), and Director of UN Operations in Western Sahara (1999–2001). He rejoined the State Department in 2003 as a special advisor for Northern Iraq.

Textile publications
Eagleton's 1988 book An Introduction to Kurdish Rugs drew from his experience collecting rugs in Baghdad and elsewhere in the middle east. It remains the standard book on Kurdish pile weavings, which remain relatively unknown even among textile collectors.

See also

Special Representative of the Secretary-General for Western Sahara

References

External links
United States Interests Section in Iraq Cable from William L. Eagleton Jr. to the Department of State. "Follow-up on Rumsfeld Visit to Baghdad", December 26, 1983
Nomination of William L. Eagleton Jr. To Be United States Ambassador to Syria

1926 births
2011 deaths
United States Navy personnel of World War II
Yale University alumni
Ambassadors of the United States to Yemen
Ambassadors of the United States to Tunisia
Ambassadors of the United States to Libya
Ambassadors of the United States to Algeria
Ambassadors of the United States to Iraq
Ambassadors of the United States to Syria
People from Peoria, Illinois
Writers from Illinois
United States Foreign Service personnel
20th-century American diplomats